Vidovdanka is a Late Mesolithic anthropomorphic figurine (cult image) made of terracotta regarded as symbol of the Vinča culture, which flourished in prehistoric Serbia in 5500 BC.

Notes and references

6th-millennium BC works
1930 archaeological discoveries
Prehistoric sculpture
Mesolithic Serbia
Archaeological discoveries in Serbia
Cult images
Figurines
Terracotta sculptures